Światopełk Karpiński (27 March 1909 in Łask – 21 April 1940 in Vilnius) was a Polish poet and satirist, brother of architect Zbigniew Karpiński, uncle of the writer and historian of ideas Wojciech Karpiński. He graduated from the School of Political Sciences in Warsaw where he was trained as a diplomat. But instead of following diplomatic career he started collaborating with various Polish newspapers and journals, among them Szpilki and Cyrulik Warszawski. For his collection of poems Trzynaście wierszy he was awarded with the main prize for youth of the Polish Academy of Literature.

Conscripted prior to the outbreak of World War II, he fought in the Defence of Warsaw. He evaded capture by the German forces and managed to get to Vilna (then under Lithuanian control), where he collaborated with various cabarets. He died under mysterious circumstances on 21 April 1940.

1909 births
1940 deaths
20th-century Polish poets
People from Łask
Polish military personnel of World War II